William Dawbney Nordhaus (born May 31, 1941) is an American economist, a Sterling Professor of Economics at Yale University, best known for his work in economic modeling and climate change, and one of the 2 recipients of the 2018 Nobel Memorial Prize in Economic Sciences. Nordhaus received the prize "for integrating climate change into long-run macroeconomic analysis".

Education and career
Nordhaus was born in Albuquerque, New Mexico, the son of Virginia (Riggs) and Robert J. Nordhaus, who co-founded the Sandia Peak Tramway. Robert J. Nordhaus was from a German Jewish family – his father Max Nordhaus (1865–1936) had immigrated from Paderborn in 1883, and became a manager of The Charles Ilfeld Company branch in Albuquerque.

Nordhaus graduated from Phillips Academy in Andover and subsequently received his BA and MA from Yale in 1963 and 1973, respectively, where he was a member of Skull and Bones. He also holds a Certificate from the Institut d'Etudes Politiques (1962) and a PhD from MIT (1967). He was a Visiting Fellow of Clare Hall, Cambridge in 1970–1971. He has been a member of the faculty at Yale since 1967, in both the Economics department and the School of the Environment. Nordhaus also served as its Provost from 1986–1988 and its Vice President for Finance and Administration from 1992–1993. He has been on the Brookings Panel on Economic Activity since 1972. During the Carter administration, from 1977–1979, Nordhaus was a member of the Council of Economic Advisers.

Nordhaus was elected to the American Philosophical Society in 2013. He served as the chairman of the board of directors of the Boston Federal Reserve Bank between 2014 and 2015.

Nordhaus lives in New Haven, Connecticut, with his wife, Barbara, a social worker recently retired from the Yale Child Study Center.

Contributions to economics and the study of climate change
Nordhaus is the author or editor of over 20 books. One of his early works, he partnered with Paul Samuelson as a co-author for an introductory textbook entitled Economics. Nordhaus worked alongside Samuelson from the 12th edition until the 19th, starting in 1985.  It was first published in 1948 and has appeared in nineteen different editions and seventeen different languages. It was known as a best-selling economics textbook for decades and is still extremely popular today. Economics was called a “canonical textbook”, and the development of mainstream economic thought has been traced by comparing the nineteen editions over the 1948–2010 period.

He has also written several books on global warming and climate change, one of his primary areas of research.  Those books include Managing the Global Commons: The Economics of Climate Change (1994), which won the 2006 Award for "Publication of Enduring Quality" from the Association of Environmental and Resource Economics. Another book, with Joseph Boyer, is Warming the World: Economic Models of Global Warming (2000), The Climate Casino: Risk, Uncertainty, and Economics for a Warming World. His most recent book is The Spirit of Green (2021).

In 1972 Nordhaus, along with fellow Yale economics professor James Tobin, published  Is Growth Obsolete?, an article that introduced the Measure of Economic Welfare (Index of Sustainable Economic Welfare) as the first attempt to develop environmental accounting.

Nordhaus is also known for his critique of current measures of national income. He wrote, "If we are to obtain accurate estimates of the growth of real incomes over the last century, we must somehow construct price indexes that account for the vast changes in the quality and range of goods and services that we consume, that somehow compare the services of horse with automobile, of Pony Express with facsimile machine, of carbon paper with photocopier, of dark and lonely nights with nights spent watching television, and of brain surgery with magnetic resonance imaging" (1997, 30).

Palda summarizes the importance of Nordhaus's insight as follows: "The practical lesson to be drawn from this fascinating study of lighting is that the way we measure the consumer price index is severely flawed. Instead of putting goods and their prices directly into the index we should reduce all goods to their constituent characteristics. Then we should evaluate how these goods can best be combined to minimize the cost of consuming these characteristics. Such an approach would allow us to include new goods in the consumer price index without worrying about whether the index of today is comparable to that of ten years ago when the good did not exist. Such an approach would also allow governments to more precisely calculate the rate at which welfare and other forms of aid should be increased. At present, such calculations tend to overestimate the cost of living because they do not take into account the manner in which increases in quality reduce the monetary cost of maintaining a certain standard of living."

Contributions on economics of climate change 
Nordhaus has written on the economics of climate change. He is the developer of the DICE and RICE models, integrated assessment models of the interplay between economics, energy use, and climate change.

A Question of Balance: Weighing the Options on Global Warming Policies  was published by Yale University Press in 2008.

In Reflections on the Economics of Climate Change (1993), he states: "Mankind is playing dice with the natural environment through a multitude of interventions – injecting into the atmosphere trace gases like the greenhouse gases or ozone-depleting chemicals, engineering massive land-use changes such as deforestation, depleting multitudes of species in their natural habitats even while creating transgenic ones in the laboratory, and accumulating sufficient nuclear weapons to destroy human civilizations."  Under the climate change models he has developed, in general those sectors of the economy that depend heavily on unmanaged ecosystems – that is, are heavily dependent upon naturally occurring rainfall, runoff, or temperatures – will be most sensitive to climate change. Agriculture, forestry, outdoor recreation, and coastal activities fall in this category." Nordhaus takes seriously the potentially catastrophic impacts of climate change.

In 2007, Nordhaus, who has done several studies on the economics of global warming, criticized the Stern Review for its use of a low discount rate:

In 2013, Nordhaus chaired a committee of the National Research Council that produced a report discounting the impact of fossil fuel subsidies on greenhouse gas emissions.

In a January 2020 interview with Neue Zürcher Zeitung, Nordhaus claimed that achieving the 2°C goal of the Paris agreement was "impossible", stating that "even if we make the fastest possible turn towards zero emissions,  will continue to accumulate in the atmosphere, because we cannot simply shut down our economy". He asserted that he was not alone in making this assessment, claiming that half of the simulation arrived at the same conclusion. He also remarked that the two-degree target was set without reference to the costs of meeting the target.

Honors

Scientific and engineering academies 
Among many honors, he is a Member of the United States National Academy of Sciences, the American Philosophical Society, and an Elected Fellow of the American Academy of Arts and Sciences. He has been a foreign member of the Royal Swedish Academy of Engineering Sciences since 1999. He was awarded the Daniel Patrick Moynihan Prize by the American Academy of Political and Social Science in 2020.

American Economic Association 
In 2004, Nordhaus was designated a Distinguished Fellow of the American Economic Association (AEA), along with George P. Shultz and William A. Brock. The accompanying AEA statement referred to his "knack for asking large questions about the measurement of economic growth and well-being, and addressing them with simple but creative insights," among them, his pioneering work on the political business cycle, ways of using national income accounts data to devise economic measures reflecting  better health, increases in leisure and life expectancy, and "constructing integrated economic and scientific models to determine the efficient path for coping with climate change". In 2013, Nordhaus became president-elect of the AEA, and served as the association's president between 2014 and 2015.

Nobel Memorial Prize in Economics 
Nordhaus was awarded the Nobel Memorial Prize in Economic Sciences in 2018, which he shared with Paul Romer. In detailing its reasons for giving the prize to Nordhaus, the Royal Swedish Academy of Sciences specifically recognized his efforts to develop "an integrated assessment model, i.e. a quantitative model that describes the global interplay between the economy and the climate. His model integrates theories and empirical results from physics, chemistry and economics. Nordhaus' model is now widely spread and is used to simulate how the economy and the climate co-evolve."

Many of the news outlets that reported on Nordhaus's prize noted that he was in the advance wave of economists who embraced a carbon tax as a preferred method of carbon pricing. Some climate scientists and commentators were disappointed with the Nobel Prize going to Nordhaus due to his embrace of substantially lower carbon taxes per ton than most scientists, along with his past history of minimal carbon taxes.

Evaluations 

The Nobel Foundation described Nordhaus's work as follows: "William Nordhaus’s findings deal with interactions between society, the economy and climate change. In the mid-1990s, he created a quantitative model that describes the global interplay between the economy and the climate. Nordhaus’s model is used to examine the consequences of climate policy interventions, for example carbon taxes." Additionally, the Nobel Prize announcement commented that Nordhaus had “significantly broadened the scope of economic analysis by constructing models that explain how the market economy interacts with nature." In an evaluation of the work, Lint Barrage summarizes its impact, stating that the "body of work also represents science at its best: integrative across disciplines, visionary in scope yet incremental in progress, transparent, and producing knowledge for the benefit of humankind."

Critics of Nordhaus's DICE model focus on several aspects. One of the most important, incorporating political and moral philosophy, is the use of discounting, with an early study by William Cline. Another branch, represented by Robert Pindyck, holds that integrated assessment models cannot capture the complexity of the climate-economy nexus. Nicholas Stern  argued that the damage function does not capture many of the most important risks to society. A particularly important critique, developed by Martin Weitzman, is that the economy-climate system may have "fat tails" and therefore inadequately deal with low probability, high consequence outcomes.

Post-Keynesian economist Steve Keen criticises the economics of climate change:
"economists made their own predictions of damages, using three spurious methods: assuming that about 90% of GDP will be unaffected by climate change, because it happens indoors; using the relationship between temperature and GDP today as a proxy for the impact of global warming over time; and using surveys that diluted extreme warnings from scientists with optimistic expectations from economists."

References

Further reading

External links
 
 
 William Nordhaus (Yale Home Page)
 The Question of Global Warming Nordhaus exchange with Freeman Dyson and others from The New York Review of Books
 Energy: Friend or Enemy? October 27, 2012 in The New York Review of Books
 
  including the Prize Lecture Climate Change: The Ultimate Challenge for Economics

Living people
1941 births
American Nobel laureates
American people of German-Jewish descent
21st-century American economists
Jewish American economists
Nobel laureates in Economics
Environmental economists
Climate economists
Energy economists
Economists from New Mexico
Yale University alumni
MIT School of Humanities, Arts, and Social Sciences alumni
Yale Sterling Professors
Fellows of the Econometric Society
Presidents of the American Economic Association
Fellows of the American Academy of Arts and Sciences
United States Council of Economic Advisers
Yale University faculty
Distinguished Fellows of the American Economic Association
Members of the Royal Swedish Academy of Engineering Sciences
Members of the United States National Academy of Sciences
People from Albuquerque, New Mexico
Fellows of Clare Hall, Cambridge
Alumni of Clare Hall, Cambridge